There are 28 secondary schools in Sandwip, Chittagong District, in the Chittagong Division of Bangladesh.

The secondary schools are:

See also

 Education in Bangladesh
 List of schools in Bangladesh

References

.
Schools in Sandwip
Sandwip